The 2003 Big 12 Conference women's basketball tournament was held March 11–15, 2003, at Reunion Arena in Dallas, Texas.

Number 1 seed  defeated number 3 seed  67–57 to win their first championship and receive the conference's automatic bid to the 2003 NCAA tournament.

Seeding
The Tournament consisted of a 12 team single-elimination tournament with the top 4 seeds receiving a bye.

Schedule

Tournament

All-Tournament team
Most Outstanding Player – Stacy Stephens, Texas

See also
2003 Big 12 Conference men's basketball tournament
2003 NCAA Division I women's basketball tournament
2002–03 NCAA Division I women's basketball rankings

References

Basketball in the Dallas–Fort Worth metroplex
Big 12 Conference women's basketball tournament
Tournament
Big 12 Conference women's basketball tournament
Big 12 Conference women's basketball tournament